Neale Junction is an isolated location in the Great Victoria Desert of Western Australia, where the Anne Beadell and Connie Sue Highways intersect. Neale Junction was named after Commander Frank Neale, who flew a Percival Gull through the area during the Mackay Aerial Reconnaissance Survey Expedition to Western and South Australia in 1935.

It has a Len Beadell marker and is indicated as suitable for camping on some maps.

Neale Junction is also a location of a large nature reserve that sits north west of the even larger Great Victoria Desert Nature Reserve.

The junction visitors book was deposited in the J S Battye Library in 2002.

See also

 Highways in Australia
 List of highways in Western Australia

References

External links
Connie Sue Highway (ExplorOz) 

Tracks in remote areas of Western Australia
Goldfields-Esperance
Roads built by Len Beadell
Great Victoria Desert